In embryogenesis, Rathke's pouch is an evagination at the roof of the developing mouth in front of the buccopharyngeal membrane. It gives rise to the anterior pituitary (adenohypophysis), a part of the endocrine system.

Development
Rathke's pouch, and therefore the anterior pituitary, is derived from ectoderm.

The pouch eventually loses its connection with the pharynx giving rise to the anterior pituitary. The anterior wall of Rathke's pouch proliferates, filling most of the pouch to form pars distalis and pars tuberalis. The posterior wall forms pars intermedia.

In some organisms, the proliferating anterior wall does not fully occupy Rathke's pouch, leaving a remnant (Rathke's cleft) between the pars distalis and pars intermedia. This remnant may develop into a large cyst, the Rathke's cleft cyst. This cyst typically doesn't cause symptoms, but, if large enough, it may cause vision loss, bitemporal hemianopsia, blurry vision, and dulled color vision.

Clinical significance
Rathke's pouch may develop benign cysts.  Craniopharyngioma is a neoplasm which can arise from the epithelium within the cleft.

Eponym
It is named for Martin Rathke.

See also
 Rathke's cleft cyst

References

External links
 
 
 Diagram at cushings-help.com
 https://web.archive.org/web/20070930075847/http://www.lib.mcg.edu/edu/eshuphysio/program/section5/5ch2/s5ch2_2.htm

Embryology of digestive system